"Divine Emotions" is a 1988 single by Narada Michael Walden, from the album Divine Emotion. A successful producer, Walden billed himself as Narada for his later music releases. 
After producing acts like Aretha Franklin and Whitney Houston in the mid-1980s, Walden released "Divine Emotions," in 1988.  The single went to number one on the Billboard dance club play chart for one week.  Although the single did not chart on the Hot 100, it peaked at number twenty-one on the soul singles chart. Overseas, "Divine Emotions", was a Top Ten hit in the UK, peaking at #8, and in the Netherlands, peaking at #4 in the Dutch Top40.

Use in media
The song was featured in the 1988 film, Bright Lights, Big City.
The song was also on the soundtrack for the video game Grand Theft Auto: Episodes from Liberty City.
The instrumental for the song was used as the original theme to the Canadian dance music show Electric Circus

Personnel
 Narada Michael Walden: lead vocals, songwriter, producer, arranger, Simmons drums
 Jeffrey Cohen: songwriter
 David Sancious: Fairlight keyboards
 Walter "Baby Love" Afanasieff: Roland Juno keyboards
 Robert "Bongo Bob" Smith: drum sampling, percussion programming
 Randy "The King" Jackson: Spector bass guitar
 Corrado Rustici: Jackson MIDI guitar solo
 Marc Russo: saxophone
 Claytoven Richardson: background vocals

Track listings

7": Reprise (US)/  9 27967-7 
"Divine Emotions (Single Mix)" - 4:12 ^
"Tighter" - 5:08

12": Reprise (US)/ 0-20874
"Divine Emotions (Remix)" - 8:48 ^
"Divine Emotions (Dub Mix)" - 7:45
"Divine Emotions (Single Mix)" - 4:12 ^
"Tighter" - 5:08

3 Inch CD Single: Reprise (Europe)/ 920 955-2, W 7967 CD
"Divine Emotions (Remix)" - 8:48 ^
"Divine Emotions (Single Mix)"- 4:12 ^
"Tighter" - 5:08

^Remix created by Shep Pettibone

Charts

Weekly charts

Year-end charts

References

1988 songs
1988 singles
Songs written by Jeffrey E. Cohen
Songs written by Narada Michael Walden
Reprise Records singles